Acartauchenius sardiniensis is a species of sheet weaver found in Sardinia. It was described by Wunderlich in 1995.

References

Linyphiidae
Spiders described in 1995
Spiders of Europe
Endemic fauna of Sardinia